is a Japanese former swimmer. She competed in two events at the 1964 Summer Olympics.

References

External links
 

1945 births
Living people
Japanese female butterfly swimmers
Olympic swimmers of Japan
Swimmers at the 1964 Summer Olympics
Place of birth missing (living people)
Asian Games medalists in swimming
Swimmers at the 1962 Asian Games
Swimmers at the 1966 Asian Games
Asian Games gold medalists for Japan
Asian Games silver medalists for Japan
Medalists at the 1962 Asian Games
Medalists at the 1966 Asian Games
20th-century Japanese women